Timothy Casey (February 20, 1862 – October 6, 1931) was the Roman Catholic Archbishop of Vancouver, Canada, from 1912 to 1931.

Curriculum vitae
Timothy Casey was born on February 20, 1862, in Flume Ridge, New Brunswick.

Ordination
In 1885, Timothy Casey became a priest of Saint John in America, New Brunswick, Canada.

Consecration
In 1900, Timothy Casey became consecrated as Bishop of Saint John in America and then was appointed as Archbishop of Vancouver in 1912.

Timothy Casey died on October 6, 1931.

Legacy
 Changed Holy Rosary church to Holy Rosary Cathedral (Vancouver).

Notes
Casey is noted for holding together the Catholic Archdiocese of Vancouver through hard financial times of pre & post World War I.

External links
 
 Archdiocese of Vancouver former bishops
 Catholic Hierarchy

20th-century Roman Catholic archbishops in Canada
Roman Catholic archbishops of Vancouver
1862 births
1931 deaths